A list of films produced by the Marathi language film industry based in Maharashtra in the year 2009.

January–March

April–June

July–September

October–December

References

Lists of 2009 films by country or language
2009
2009 in Indian cinema